Moulis may refer to:

Places
 Moulis, Ariège, a French commune in the department of Ariège
 Moulis, Tarn-et-Garonne, an ancient French commune in Tarn-et-Garonne, today part of Reyniès
 Moulis-en-Médoc, French commune in the department of Gironde

People
 Danny Moulis (born 1960), Australian footballer
 Pavel Moulis (born 1991), Czech footballer

Other uses
 Moulis-en-Médoc AOC, a red wine appellation in Bordeaux, situated around the commune Moulis-en-Médoc

See also
 Mouli (disambiguation)

oc:Molins (Arièja)